Kristina Karamo is an American far-right politician and former poll watcher who is serving as the chairperson of the Michigan Republican Party. Karamo was the Republican Party's nominee in the 2022 Michigan Secretary of State election, losing by a wide margin to incumbent Democrat Jocelyn Benson.  

Karamo is a staunch proponent of the disproven conspiracy theory that Donald Trump won Michigan (and the national presidential election) in 2020.

Education
Karamo received an associate's degree from Macomb County Community College. She graduated from  Oakland University with a bachelor's in communications and media studies. She graduated from Biola University’s Talbot School of Theology with a master’s degree in Christian Apologetics.

Political career 
Karamo is a member of the MIGOP State Committee. She ran for the 10th district of the Oakland County Board of Commissioners in 2018, which covers the city of Pontiac, but lost in the Republican primary.

2020 presidential election 
Karamo was a poll watcher in the 2020 presidential election. After the 2020 presidential election she became an election denier. She alleged illegal votes were included in the count. She submitted an affidavit that she had as a poll watcher "personally witnessed" irregularities in vote counting. After the January 6th United States Capitol attack she called it a false-flag operation, saying that "this is completely Antifa posing as Trump supporters...anybody can buy a MAGA hat and put on a t-shirt and buy a Trump flag”.

2022 Michigan Secretary of State candidacy 
Karamo was previously the party's nominee in the 2022 Michigan Secretary of State election. She framed her platform as based on family values and religion, including a religious objection to abortion.

Two weeks before election day she filed a lawsuit, in which she alleged ballot "mules" had cast illegal ballots and that there were concerns with voting machines, attempting to throw out absentee ballots from Detroit.

Karamo lost to incumbent Democrat Jocelyn Benson. She lost by 14 percentage points and refused to concede the election.

Michigan Republican Party Chair 
In 2023 Karamo was elected to lead the state's Republican Party. After the election she reiterated her refusal to concede the Secretary of State election, saying "Conceding to a fraudulent person is agreeing with the fraud, which I will not do." Karamo is the first Black woman to chair the Michigan Republican party.

Personal life 
Karamo is a resident of Oak Park. She is an instructor at Wayne County Community College. She is a single mother of two children.

In an October 2021 court record first published by Jezebel, Kristina's ex-husband Adom Karamo claimed that Kristina threatened to kill herself and their daughters in a car crash. Karamo denied these allegations, saying they were an attempt by her ex-husband to "exploit the fact that [she is] a public figure, using it as leverage to change the custody agreement he became dissatisfied with". Kristina and Adom had divorced in 2014.

Karamo believes that demonic possession is real and may be transferred through sexual relations. She has also said that abortion is child sacrifice and a satanic practice.

Electoral history

References

External links

1980s births
21st-century African-American politicians
21st-century African-American women
21st-century American women politicians
Activists from Michigan
African-American activists
African-American people in Michigan politics
African-American women in politics
American conspiracy theorists
American women activists
Biola University alumni
Black conservatism in the United States
Far-right politicians in the United States
Living people
Michigan Republican Party chairs
Oakland University alumni
Talbot School of Theology alumni
Women in Michigan politics